Mycena austrofilopes is a species of mushroom in the family Mycenaceae. It has been found growing in leaf litter under Eucalyptus trees in Victoria, Australia.

References

External links

Fungi described in 1997
Fungi of Australia
austrofilopes
Taxa named by Cheryl A. Grgurinovic